Euthystachys is a genus of flowering plants in the family Stilbaceae described as a genus in 1848. There is only one known species, Euthystachys abbreviata, native to the Cape Province region in South Africa.

References

Stilbaceae
Monotypic Lamiales genera
Endemic flora of South Africa